Ryan Ammerman (born December 30, 1985) is an American male volleyball player. He is part of the United States men's national volleyball team.

References

External links
 profile at FIVB.org

1985 births
Living people
American men's volleyball players
Place of birth missing (living people)
UC Irvine Anteaters men's volleyball players